Li Shufang (born May 6, 1979 in Qingdao, Shandong) is a female Chinese judoka who competed in the 2000 Summer Olympics and in the 2004 Summer Olympics.

In 2000, she won the silver medal in the half middleweight class.

Four years later she was eliminated in the round of 16 of the half middleweight class.

References
 profile

1979 births
Living people
Judoka at the 2000 Summer Olympics
Judoka at the 2004 Summer Olympics
Olympic judoka of China
Olympic silver medalists for China
Sportspeople from Qingdao
Olympic medalists in judo
Asian Games medalists in judo
Judoka at the 2002 Asian Games
Chinese female judoka
Medalists at the 2000 Summer Olympics
Asian Games bronze medalists for China
Medalists at the 2002 Asian Games
20th-century Chinese women
21st-century Chinese women